John Curtin College of the Arts, originally John Curtin High School, is an independent, public co-educational, partially selective high school, located in East Street, a suburb of Perth, Western Australia.

The school provides a general and specialist education to students from the greater Fremantle area, and intake for gifted and talented arts and soccer programmes from across Western Australia. Currently, John Curtin College of the Arts has gifted and talented programmes in the following disciplines: visual arts, media arts (television and film studies), music, contemporary dance, ballet, drama (acting studies) and musical theatre.  As of Semester 1, 2022 the school had 1,817 students.

School historical context 
The school was named to commemorate John Curtin, the late local federal MP and 14th Prime Minister of Australia. It was built at an estimated cost of £430,000 to amalgamate the overcrowded Fremantle Boys' and Princess May Girls' schools, the two state secondary schools serving the Fremantle area. The foundation stone was laid on 29 October 1954 by Premier Hawke. Jack Howieson, principal of Fremantle Boys', was appointed the initial principal. In February 1956, classes began in the first stage of the new school, while work continued on the construction of second and third stages with completion in 1958. During the first decade of the school's operation a number of annexes were dotted around Fremantle and included Princess May Annexe (Princess May Girls' School (fmr)), Finnerty Street Annexe (Fremantle Arts Centre), Fremantle Boys' Annexe (Film and Television Institute), the North Fremantle Annexe (North Fremantle Primary School (fmr)) and the East Street Trades Centre (Manual Arts Building).

John Curtin has elements of an earlier education building campaign on the site, a two-storey brick Manual Trades Block that was constructed circa 1943 after an existing Fremantle Technical School manual arts building in South Terrace was taken over for defence purposes in 1941 and in view of the then proposals for the erection of a new Fremantle Technical High School.

The science annex, built later than the main school, was funded by a Commonwealth Government grant under the 1960s era Commonwealth Laboratory program. A new arts centre was added in 1987.

John Curtin College of the Arts has Gifted and Talented programs including drama, contemporary dance, music, ballet, music theatre, visual arts, media arts, a soccer/football excellence program and the Academic Extension Program (AEP) for English, mathematics, science and humanities.

In 1992, a history of the school was written by the then Ancient History teacher, Tim Johnson.  The volume, Guns, Graves and Dreaming: the History of Fremantle's High School: John Curtin Senior High School, was never published, but is available at a number of Western Australian libraries.

In 2001, the College was placed on the State Register of Heritage Places.

On 12 November 2006 John Curtin College of the Arts hosted a gathering for the school community to celebrate its 50th year of operation.

Over the course of 2015, the college added a new section to the school. This area contains extension to the existing science block, housing new dance and mathematics classrooms, new offices for both the mathematics and science departments as well as new seating areas for the graduating year.

Site history 
The Skinner Street Cemetery, Fremantle's first official cemetery was on the land that is now the college oval. The cemetery was first established in 1852 and used until 1899, when it was closed for general burials. The last burial took place in 1917. It later fell into disuse. Throughout the 1930s all unbroken headstones were transferred to Fremantle Cemetery on Carrington Street. Families were required to pay for the exhumation and reburial of their relatives’ remains. It is estimated that the remains of up to 200 bodies may still be buried on the site.

Following the entrance of Japan into World War II and the threat of attack on Australia, four anti-aircraft gun emplacements were established on the portion of the site bounded by Ellen and East streets. Throughout the war years the former cemetery was a base camp used by the troops who manned the guns and was a significant part of Fortress Fremantle for the defence of the port.

Notable alumni
 Murray Bartlett - actor
 Sir Hughie Edwards  (1914–1982) - 23rd Governor of Western Australia, Air Commodore Royal Air Force (Fremantle Boys School)
 Megan Gale - fashion model
 David Holmgren - co-originator of the permaculture concept
 Courtney Johns - Australian rules footballer
 Brad Jones - Association footballer
 Ken Judge - Australian rules footballer and coach
 Ewen Leslie - actor
 Simon Lyndon - actor
 Stuart MacLeod - musician, Eskimo Joe
 Paul Mercurio - actor and dancer
 Marco Paparone - Australian rules footballer
 Kelly Paterniti - actress
 Bon Scott - musician, AC/DC
 Greg Stone - actor
 David Tarka - Association footballer
 Kavyen Temperley - musician, Eskimo Joe
 Ta-ku - musician
 Lisa de Vanna - Association footballer
 Sam Worthington - actor
 Sasha Zhoya - track and field athlete

See also 

 List of schools in Western Australia

References

External links 

 John Curtin College of the Arts website (established in 1997 with a team of student editors).

Public high schools in Perth, Western Australia
Educational institutions established in 1942
Heritage places in Fremantle
Ellen Street, Fremantle
East Street, Fremantle
State Register of Heritage Places in the City of Fremantle
1942 establishments in Australia